Kroswia is a genus of lichens in the family Pannariaceae. It consists of four paleotropical species: K. epispora, K. gemmascens, K. polydactyla, and the type, K. crystallifera. Species in the genus are characterized by their gelatinous, homoiomerous (uniform in structure, without differentiation into distinct tissues), and ecorticate (without a cortex) thallus. The ascocarps contain terpenoids and fatty acids. The genus was circumscribed by Norwegian lichenologist Per Magnus Jørgensen in 2002.

The genus name of Kroswia is in honour of Hildur Krog (1922–2014), who was a Norwegian botanist and Thomas Douglas Victor Swinscow (1917-1992), a British writer, editor and physician.

References

Peltigerales
Peltigerales genera
Lichen genera
Taxa named by Per Magnus Jørgensen
Taxa described in 2002